Naenae College, is a state-run coeducational secondary school located in north-central Lower Hutt, New Zealand. It is situated on a  site in the suburb of Avalon. The school was founded in 1953 to serve the Naenae state housing development, although the school is located in the suburb of Avalon.

The school has an enrolment of  students from Years 9 to 13 (ages 12 to 18) as of  Nic Richards is the current principal.

History
Construction of Naenae began the late 1940s under Prime Minister Peter Fraser and the First Labour Government. It was supposed to become a "designer community" of suburban state housing. With the raising of the school leaving age from fourteen to fifteen in 1944, the expansion of Naenae and wider Lower Hutt, and the start of the post-World War II baby boom, Naenae College was built to accommodate secondary school students north of central Lower Hutt.

Naenae College was a prototype for a standardised building design to be used at other new secondary schools across New Zealand. The school was built with long two-story wings of classrooms facing onto corridors, constructed with reinforced concrete on the first level and timber above that. However, construction of the so-called "Naenae type school" was too slow and expensive for a large scale building programme, and subsequently, the Naenae type was largely replaced with a single-storey all-timber version known as the "Henderson type school". Both types lasted four years before being phased out in 1957 in place of self-contained classroom blocks.

The school opened for instruction at the beginning of 1953. John Russell was principal from 2007 to 2017. Russell won Senior New Zealander of the Year in 2016 for his work at the college.

In 2019 it was announced that due to monetary trouble, the Ministry of Education wiped $760,000 of $1m owing by Naenae College from a loan it received in 2004. Principal Nic Richards had written to the Ministry advising that the servicing of the debt meant that the school's property was in "very poor condition", and it reduced the resources that were available to students.

Naenae College is one of 790 low decile schools in New Zealand that is part of the free school lunch programme.

Enrolment
Naenae College does not operate an enrolment scheme, so the school is open to enrolment from any eligible student. Its effective service area is central-north Lower Hutt, including the suburbs of Avalon, Belmont, Boulcott, Epuni, Fairfield, Kelson, Naenae and Wingate. Naenae College is easily accessible from most of the Hutt Valley, with bus routes to Petone, central Lower Hutt, Stokes Valley and Upper Hutt passing outside the school's front gate, and Naenae Railway Station a five-minute walk away.Naenae College has a roll of 748 students from Years 9 to 13 (ages 12 to 18); with 34% Maori, 22% Pacifika, 23% European and 37% other nationalities. The college currently enrols 30 adult education students and 20 in a Year 12 service academy.

The school has a socio-economic decile rating of 3G (low-band decile 3), meaning it draws its school community from areas of moderately-high socio-economic disadvantage when compared to other New Zealand schools. The current decile came into force in January 2015, after a nationwide review of deciles following the 2013 Census. Previously, Naenae had a decile of 2F (high-band decile 2).

From January 2023, the socio-economic decile rating system will be phased out in New Zealand. It will be replaced with the Equity Index, Naenae College has been given an EQI number of 497.

Academic performance 
In 2020, 73.5 percent of students leaving Naenae College held at least NCEA Level 1, 61.6 percent held at least NCEA Level 2, and 36.4 percent held at least University Entrance. This is compared to 88.4%, 80.8%, and 59.1% respectively for all students nationally in 2020.

Board of Trustees 
The Naenae College Board of Trustees consists of eleven elected and appointed members.

Notable staff
Bruce Murray, international cricketer – served as principal from 1981 to 1988
Brian Wilkins – New Zealand mountaineer (a former teacher at Naenae)

Notable alumni

William Cate and William Robinson aka Bill and Boyd - (attended mid-1950s), pop music duo
Billy Graham - New Zealand boxer
Brooke Fraser – (attended c. 1997–2001), singer-songwriter
Sir Bob Jones – (attended 1953–1957) businessman and former politician; foundation pupil.
Stephen Kós – judge at the Supreme Court of New Zealand and former President of the Court of Appeal of New Zealand.
Aaron Tokona – Musician with Weta and Fly My Pretties.
Dan Wootton – journalist and broadcaster
Michael Hedges - sound engineer
Mario Wynands - Game developer and Business Owner

Coat of Arms

References

External links
School website
Naenae College - (ERO) Education Review Office report
School Facebook page

Educational institutions established in 1953
Schools in Lower Hutt
Secondary schools in the Wellington Region
1953 establishments in New Zealand